This is a list of notable events relating to the environment in 2014. They relate to environmental law, conservation, environmentalism and environmental issues.

Events
The IPCC Fifth Assessment Report is set to be finalised and released.
California delays its carbon trading programme until 2014 due to ongoing litigation.

February
A facility in Eden, North Carolina spilled 39,000 tons of coal ash into the Dan River.

See also

Human impact on the environment
List of environmental issues

References